Mount Vista is a census-designated place (CDP) in Clark County, Washington, United States. It includes the Vancouver campus of Washington State University. The population of Mount Vista was 7,850 at the 2010 census, up from 5,770 at the 2000 census.

Based on per capita income, one of the more reliable measures of affluence, Mount Vista ranks 66th of 614 areas in the state of Washington to be ranked.

Geography
Mount Vista is located in southwestern Clark County at  (45.733638, -122.641595). It is bordered to the west by Interstate 5, to the southwest by the community of Salmon Creek, and to the southeast by Barberton.

Demographics
As of the census of 2000, there were 5,770 people, 2,215 households, and 1,705 families residing in the CDP. The population density was 1,103.8 people per square mile (426.0/km2). There were 2,347 housing units at an average density of 449.0/sq mi (173.3/km2). The racial makeup of the CDP was 93.08% White, 0.99% African American, 0.43% Native American, 2.82% Asian, 0.14% Pacific Islander, 0.47% from other races, and 2.06% from two or more races. Hispanic or Latino of any race were 2.46% of the population. 21.9% were of German, 11.7% English, 9.4% American, 7.0% Norwegian and 5.5% Irish ancestry according to Census 2000.

There were 2,215 households, out of which 33.1% had children under the age of 18 living with them, 66.1% were married couples living together, 7.6% had a female householder with no husband present, and 23.0% were non-families. 17.4% of all households were made up of individuals, and 4.2% had someone living alone who was 65 years of age or older. The average household size was 2.60 and the average family size was 2.95.

In the CDP, the age distribution of the population shows 24.8% under the age of 18, 8.0% from 18 to 24, 26.9% from 25 to 44, 30.3% from 45 to 64, and 10.0% who were 65 years of age or older. The median age was 40 years. For every 100 females, there were 95.5 males. For every 100 females age 18 and over, there were 93.5 males.

The median income for a household in the CDP was $66,406, and the median income for a family was $68,539. Males had a median income of $48,264 versus $34,972 for females. The per capita income for the CDP was $29,594. About 2.8% of families and 3.4% of the population were below the poverty line, including 5.2% of those under age 18 and 4.8% of those age 65 or over.

References

Census-designated places in Clark County, Washington
Census-designated places in Washington (state)